Michael Collins (born 12 February 1961) is a British author, journalist and television presenter.

Early life 
Collins was born in Walworth, south east London, England. He attended Archbishop Michael Ramsey comprehensive school in Camberwell. In 1977, as part of the Great Education Debate, the school was the subject of the Thames Television documentary Our School and Hard Times. That same year, aged 16, he left school and trained as a bespoke tailor.

Career 
Throughout the 1990s, he worked in television production as a scriptwriter and producer.  During this time he wrote the Channel 4 documentaries The Battersea Bardot (1994) and The National Alf (1994).

His book The Likes Of Us: A Biography of the White Working Class won the George Orwell Prize in 2005. The book was serialized in The Guardian  and became the Channel Four documentary The Biography of the British Working Class, which was written and presented by the author.

In 2011, he wrote and presented The Great Estate, a documentary about social housing in the UK. broadcast on BBC4 and BBC2.

His BBC4 documentary on suburbia, Everyday Eden: A Potted History of the Suburban Garden was broadcast in April 2014.

Collins has contributed to BBC TV's The Culture Show and The Politics Show as well as Radio 4's Start the Week, Woman's Hour, Saturday Review and The Long View.

He has also written on television, film, new media, politics and history for numerous newspapers and magazines, including the Observer, Guardian, Independent, TLS, Sunday Telegraph, Prospect, New Statesman, Literary Review, Wallpaper, French Vogue and The Sunday Times.

References

External links
 Another Michael Collins - official website
 Michael Collins at Journalisted
 Michael Collins articles at The Independent
 "Junkspace" (short story) by Michael Collins, The Sunday Times, 13 Dec. 2009
 The Great Estate: The Rise and Fall of the Council House (documentary), BBC Four
 Everyday Eden: A Potted History of the Suburban Garden (documentary), BBC 4, 2014
 The Biography of the British Working Class (documentary) at Channel 4
Michael Collins interviewed by Andrew Marr,  BBC Radio 4, "Start The Week" programme, 2004
 Michael Collins: The Demonisation of the White Working Class, The New Culture Forum Channel, 2020

1961 births
Living people
British male journalists
British republicans